The Baker format in Ten-pin bowling is the cornerstone of team play because each player contributes frames to a single game. A single player on a 5-person team would bowl frames 1 & 6,  2 & 7, etc.  To bowl a perfect Baker 300, all 5 players have to throw two strikes each and the final bowler, or "anchor", having to throw the two fill frames in the 10th for a total of four. Only a handful of Baker 300 games have been shot which is made more difficult as games in NCAA bowling are played on sport compliant patterns.

The following list records the NCAA Baker 300 games shot to date:

 Players in bold contributed strikes in more than one Baker 300 game.

References 

Ten-pin bowling competitions in the United States